Raymond Henry Smith (August 27, 1908 – May 1984) was an American football center who played three seasons in the National Football League with the Providence Steam Roller and Philadelphia Eagles. He first enrolled at the University of Tulsa before transferring to the University of Missouri. He attended Sapulpa High School in Sapulpa, Oklahoma. Smith was also a member of the Portsmouth Spartans.

References

External links
Just Sports Stats

1908 births
1984 deaths
Players of American football from Missouri
American football centers
Tulsa Golden Hurricane football players
Missouri Tigers football players
Providence Steam Roller players
Philadelphia Eagles players